Irena Skwierczyńska (26 April 1897 – 15 May 1984) was a Polish film actress. She appeared in more than 25 films between 1933 and 1971.

Selected filmography
 His Excellency, The Shop Assistant (1933)
 Prokurator Alicja Horn (1933)
 Wacuś (1935)
 Granny Had No Worries (1935)
 Będzie lepiej (1936)
 30 karatów szczęścia (1936)
 Niedorajda (1937)
 Rena (1938)
 Paweł i Gaweł (1938)

References

External links

1897 births
1984 deaths
Polish film actresses
Polish stage actresses
Actresses from Warsaw
20th-century Polish actresses